Star Circle Quest (SCQ) is a reality-based talent competition which premiered on March 1, 2004 locally on ABS-CBN and internationally through The Filipino Channel. It features at least 10 contestants called "questors" will have to undergo talent training, physical enhancement and different challenges to test their talent skills. The remaining questor after weekly eliminations will be declared as the Grand Questor. He or she takes home a cash prize and an exclusive contract with ABS-CBN Talent Center (now Star Magic).

The theme song was sung by Star in a Million finalists Sheryn Regis and Marinel Santos.

Overview
In 1992, Mr. Johnny Manahan and Freddie M. Garcia formed ABS-CBN Talent Center, now known as Star Magic to hone individuals as exclusive talents of the network. Manahan then introduced Star Circle, an untelevised talent search which aims to look for fresh faces to be the next idol. 12 years later, after having 12 batches and more than 120 members, Star Circle was brought to Philippine TV as a reality talent search. Auditions for the first season were held between October 2003 and January 2004. Before the said competition was aired, ABS-CBN aired the celebration of Star Circle as well as the launch of Star Circle Quest on February 27, 2004, presenting the Top 200 kid & teen aspirants who passed the screenings. The show premiered on March 1, 2004 on primetime.

Star Circle Quest has aired 2 seasons for teens and 4 seasons for kids. Aside from the Grand Questor, the show also awards the top 5 finalists of the season called Magic Circle of Five, with the exception of the last season, wherein it only awarded Grand Girl Kiddie Superstar and Grand Boy Kiddie Superstar.

Hosts and jury
Traditionally, the show is presented with two hosts, while the jury is composed of three mentors.

Hosts

Luis Manzano (2004–2006)
Jodi Sta. Maria (2004–2005)
Anne Curtis (2006)
Ruffa Gutierrez (2009)
Ai-Ai delas Alas (2009)
KC Concepcion (2010–2011)

Jury

Teen Quest Jury
Boy Abunda (2004–2005)
Gloria Diaz (2004–2005)
Laurenti Dyogi (2004–2005)

Kid Quest Jury
Eula Valdez (2004–2006)
Maricel Laxa (2004)
Joyce Bernal (2006)
Ricky Davao (2006)
Rowell Santiago (2004, 2010–2011)
Vina Morales (2010–2011)
Gladys Reyes (2010–2011)

Season overview

Star Circle Quest - Regular Edition

Star Circle Quest - Kids Edition

Seasons

Star Circle Quest (season 1)

The first season of Star Circle Quest titled Star Circle Teen Quest premiered on March 1, 2004 with Luis Manzano and Jodi Sta. Maria as the hosts. entertainment personality Boy Abunda, TV director Laurenti Dyogi and former beauty queen Gloria Diaz completed the panel of judges called the "jury". The first season ended with a grand finals at the Araneta Coliseum on June 5, 2004 with Hero Angeles being hailed as the Grand Questor.

Star Circle Kid Quest (season 1)
The first season of Star Circle Kid Quest was launched the same day as the main edition. The show features kids from 5 to 9 years old. Manzano and Sta. Maria reprise their hosting duties, although the jury is now composed of award-winning actress Eula Valdez, veteran actress Maricel Laxa and TV director Rowell Santiago. The kids who made it to the Magic Circle of 10 were Nash Aguas, Sharlene San Pedro, Aaron Junatas, CJ Navato, Mikylla Ramirez, Jodell Stasic, Khaycee Aboloc, Alex Ramos, Basty Alcances and Celine Lim.

The Grand Questors Night for the Kid Quest was held at the Araneta Coliseum on June 5, 2004, around 5:30 PM, with theStar Circle Teen Quest'''s turn after. Nash Aguas became the Grand Questor, making Sharlene San Pedro as the second placer, while Aaron Junatas is in third place, Mikylla Ramirez in fourth and CJ Navato in fifth place.

Star Circle Quest (season 2)

ABS-CBN came up with a second season of Star Circle Teen Quest with the title Star Circle National Teen Quest after auditions were held nationwide and in some parts worldwide. Manzano and Sta. Maria continue to host the show, while the same jury guided the finalists throughout the program.

Thousands of teen aspirants auditioned but only 15 made it to the Final 15 or the "Magic Circle of 15", namely Erich Gonzales, Arron Villaflor, Paw Diaz, Charles Christianson, DM Sevilla,  Janelle Quintana, Theo Bernados Michelle Arciaga, Jason Abalos, Bebs & KC Hollman, Reynan Pitero, OJ Decena, Vanessa Grindrund, Marla Boyd, Franz Ocampo.

Grand Questors Night
The Grand Questors Night was hosted at the PhilSports Arena.

Finally the Magic Circle of 5 showcased the numbers they have been rehearsing hard for. Each final questor showed their special talent that night which impressed the jurors as well as the thousands of audiences.

Erich Gonzales became the Grand Questor, Arron Villaflor was in the second, Paw Diaz in third, Charles Christianson in fourth, and DM Sevilla in fifth place.

2006: Star Circle Summer Kid Quest (Season 2)
In 2006 the show made the second season of the kids edition. The show was called Summer Kid Quest because it was held in summer, between March–May.

Luis Manzano still hosts the show, however, Jodi Sta. Maria was replaced by Anne Curtis in hosting due to her pregnancy. Meanwhile, director Joyce Bernal and award-winning actor Ricky Davao joins Eula Valdez and replaces Rowell Santiago and Maricel Laxa.

Grand Questors Day
It was held at ABS-CBN Studio 1. It was called Grand Questors' Day because it was held during the afternoon instead of the usual primetime.

Quintin Alianza became the Grand Questor, Mika Dela Cruz became the second placer, Julio Pisk is in the third place, Cheska Billiones in fourth and Darius Cardano in fifth place.

2009: Star Circle Kid Quest: Search for the Kiddie Idol (Season 3)
The reality kid talent show was now transformed as a program segment of Ruffa & Ai'' every Wednesday with Ai-Ai de las Alas and Ruffa Gutierrez as main hosts. Bugoy Cariño became the Grand Questor, Izzy Canillo as the first runner-up, while Eros Espiritu finished in second place, Xyriel Manabat in third and Fatty Mendoza in fourth place.

2010-2011: Star Circle Quest: Search for the Next Kiddie Superstars (Season 4)

On December 4, 2010, the show was re-launched as a Saturday primetime program hosted by KC Concepcion with Bugoy Cariño and Xyriel Manabat as kid co-hosts respectively. Audition ran from November 27 to 29, 2010, and Rowell Santiago reprised his role as judge from Season 1 along with the new female judges namely Vina Morales and Gladys Reyes.

The kids who made it to the Magic Circle of 10 were Ogie Escanilla, Brenna Peñaflor, Clarence Delgado, Kyline Alcantara, Joshen Bernardo, Janine Berdin, Jelo Eechaluce, Maurice Mabutas, Kristoff Meneses and Veyda Inoval.

Brenna Peñaflor was crowned as the Grand Girl Kiddie Superstar and Clarence Delgado was crowned as the Grand Boy Kiddie Superstar on February 19, 2011.

Awards
Star Circle Quest won the Star Awards for 2004 Best Talent Search Program. Jodi Sta. Maria and Luis Manzano as Best Talent Search Program Host.

See also
Star Magic

External links
 Star Circle Quest Official Website
 The Star Circle Quest Community

 
Philippine reality television series
ABS-CBN original programming
2004 Philippine television series debuts
2011 Philippine television series endings
Filipino-language television shows